Jim Hall/Red Mitchell is a live album by guitarist Jim Hall and bassist Red Mitchell recorded at Sweet Basil Jazz Club in 1978 and released by the Artists House label.

Reception

Allmusic reviewer by Scott Yanow called it a "lyrical, introverted, and sometimes exquisite set of duets" and said "Hall and Mitchell always had big ears, and although the music is at a low volume and the duo stretches out ... there are no sleepy moments".

Track listing
All compositions by Jim Hall except where noted
 "Big Blues" − 6:23
 "Beautiful" (Red Mitchell) − 7:50
 "Waltz New" − 5:05
 "Fly Me to the Moon" (Bart Howard) − 6:18
 "Blue Dove" (Traditional) − 9:15
 "Osaka Express" − 4:38

Personnel
Jim Hall − guitar
Red Mitchell − bass

References 

1978 live albums
Jim Hall (musician) live albums
Red Mitchell live albums
Artists House live albums